Lengyel Balázs (Budapest, 21 August 1918 – Budapest, 22 February 2007) was a Hungarian literary critic, and Righteous Among the Nations.

References

External links

1918 births
2007 deaths
Hungarian children's writers
Hungarian literary critics
Hungarian writers
Hungarian Righteous Among the Nations